Umar Sulaiman Al-Ashqar (1940 - 10 August 2012: Arabic: عمر بن سليمان الاشقر) was a Salafi Muslim Brotherhood scholar who served as a professor in the Faculty of Islamic Law at the University of Jordan and was also the Dean of the Faculty of Islamic Law at al-Zarqa’ University, also in Jordan. Additionally, he authored a number of books on Islam, including the Islamic Creed Series. He died on 10 August 2012.

References

1940 births
2012 deaths
Palestinian writers
Jordanian writers
Jordanian Salafis
Palestinian Muslim Brotherhood members
Jordanian Muslim Brotherhood members
Al-Azhar University alumni
People from Nablus Governorate
Palestinian emigrants to Jordan